Parabathymyrus is a genus of eels in the family Congridae.

Species
There are currently 6 recognized species in this genus:
 Parabathymyrus brachyrhynchus (Fowler, 1934)
 Parabathymyrus fijiensis Karmovskaya, 2004
 Parabathymyrus karrerae Karmovskaya, 1991
 Parabathymyrus macrophthalmus Kamohara, 1938
 Parabathymyrus oregoni D. G. Smith & Kanazawa, 1977 (Flap-nose conger)
 Parabathymyrus philippinensis H. C. Ho, D. G. Smith & K. T. Shao, 2015

References

Congridae